Exchange Plaza is a 40-storey skyscraper in Perth, Western Australia. Completed in 1991, the  building is the state headquarters of the Australian Securities Exchange. Currently it is the sixth tallest skyscraper in Perth after QV.1, the BankWest Tower, City Square and Central Park.

Site history and construction
The land on which the tower stands is owned by the historic Weld Club, a gentlemen's club located at the rear of the site, at the corner of Barrack Street and The Esplanade. The land was leased by the Weld Club to the tower's developers for 135 years.

The building was the result of a 50–50 joint venture between Westpac subsidiary Australian Guarantee Corporation (AGC) and the Japanese C. Itoh and Shimizu. Construction on the building started during the 1980s property boom at a cost of between $220 million and $230 million. The tower was built by Multiplex, topping out occurred in mid-1991 and construction completed in 1992.

Post-completion
Considered one of Perth's premium office towers, in July 2008 a portion of space halfway up Exchange Plaza was leased for $900 per square metre: the highest cost per square metre ever seen in Perth.

The roof of the building has been used as a base from which to launch shells in the annual Lotterywest Skyworks fireworks display.

Ownership
In 1992, Westpac bought out the share in the development of C. Ito and Shimizu, and took over the AGC share in the property. Westpac put the tower's leasehold on the market in late 1996 at a hefty discount to its development cost. The leasehold was purchased in April 1997 by Schroders Property for $106 million. The acquisition was structured as a 50-50 joint venture between the Schroders Property Fund and the unlisted Schroders Private Property Syndicate.
This was the largest CBD office purchase since AMP purchased the BankWest Tower in 1994.
Control of the building was obtained by AMP Asset Management when it took over the Schroders property portfolios in 1999.

In June 2003, Stockland bought a 50% share in the building. By 2006, the building was jointly owned by Stockland Trust Group and Colonial First State Property PPS Fund.

In late 2011, AMP Asset Management purchased Stockland's stake for $157.7m.

Design
Exchange Plaza was designed by architects Peddle Thorp & Walker. It is a steel-framed structure with pre-cast concrete floor panels. The exterior of the building is fully glazed with curtain walls, which step back at the upper levels. The unique blue glass was produced in a one-off batch by Pilkingtons Australia.

The building features a 150-seat conference centre and uninterrupted river views from most levels
all across Perth Water and west all the way to Rottnest Island.

The building has  of net lettable area across 33 commercial office levels.
In addition there are three plant floor levels and five basement parking levels, with 236 car parking spaces. Construction on the southern car park started in January 1998 and finished in May 2000, and involved the construction of the deepest wall that had ever been built in Perth. The complex also includes a 10-storey podium building fronting Sherwood Court.

As part of the development, dining, accommodation, tennis and bowls facilities were constructed for the Weld Club. The existing bowling green of the Weld Club had to be excavated for the construction of the car park, then replaced. In order to preserve as far as possible the historic character of the Weld Club site, the developers had to secure century-old bricks and tiles to integrate the base of the tower with the Club complex.

Gallery

References

External links

 Official site
 Emporis page on the tower
 SkyscraperPage page on the tower

Skyscrapers in Perth, Western Australia
Office buildings in Perth, Western Australia
Office buildings completed in 1992
Skyscraper office buildings in Australia